Jin Chengjun (born 17 January 1997) is a Chinese footballer of Korean descent who currently plays for China League Two side Yanbian Longding.

Club career
Jin Chengjun transferred back to Chinese Super League side Yanbian Funde on 19 January 2017 after two-year spell at Qingdao Huanghai youth team. He was promoted to the Yanbian's first team squad in the 2017 season. On 5 March 2017, Jin made his senior debut in a 0–0 away draw against Chongqing Lifan as the benefit of the new rule of the Super League that at least one Under-23 player must in the starting. He was substituted off in the 27th minute.

On 1 March 2019, Jin transferred to China League Two side Yanbian Beiguo. He would attract the attention of second tier club Beijing Renhe, however he would not make any senior appearances and joined another second tier club in Chengdu Rongcheng on 11 April 2021. He would go on to be loaned out to third tier club Yanbian Longding on 26 July 2021, before making his move permanent the following season.

Career statistics
.

References

External links
 

1997 births
Living people
Chinese footballers
Association football forwards
People from Yanbian
Yanbian Funde F.C. players
Beijing Renhe F.C. players
Chinese Super League players
China League One players
China League Two players
Chinese people of Korean descent
Footballers from Jilin